Technical Illustration is illustration meant to visually communicate information of a technical nature. Technical illustrations can be components of technical drawings or diagrams. Technical illustrations in general aim "to generate expressive images that effectively convey certain information via the visual channel to the human observer".

Technical illustrations generally have to describe and explain the subjects to a nontechnical audience. Therefore, the visual image should be accurate in terms of dimensions and proportions, and should provide "an overall impression of what an object is or does, to enhance the viewer’s interest and understanding".

Types

Types of communication
Today, technical illustration can be broken down into three categories based on the type of communication:

 Communication with the general public: informs the general public, for example illustrated instructions found in the manuals for automobiles and consumer electronics. This type of technical illustration contains simple terminology and symbols that can be understood by the lay person and is sometimes called creative technical illustration/graphics.
 Specialized engineering or scientific communication: used by engineers/scientists to communicate with their peers and in specifications. This use of technical illustration has its own complex terminology and specialized symbols; examples are the fields of atomic energy, aerospace and military/defense. These areas can be further broken down into disciplines of mechanical, electrical, architectural engineering and many more.
 Communication between highly skilled experts: used by engineers to communicate with people who are highly skilled in a field, but who are not engineers. Examples of this type of technical illustration are illustrations found in user/operator documentation. These illustrations can be very complex and have jargon and symbols not understood by the general public, such as illustrations that are part of instructional materials for operating CNC machinery.

Types of drawings
Main types of drawings in technical communication are:
 conventional line drawings,
 exploded view drawings,
 cutaway drawings, and
 clip art images

Techniques

Technical illustration uses several basic mechanical drawing configurations called axonometric projection. These are: 
 Parallel projections (oblique, planometric, isometric, dimetric, and trimetric), and
 many types of perspective projections (with one, two, or three vanishing points).
Technical illustration and computer-aided design can also use 3D and solid-body projections, such as rapid prototyping.
In the natural sciences, "scientific illustration" refers to a style of drawing using stippling and simple line techniques to convey information with a minimum of artistic interpretation.

Examples

Further reading

See also

 Archaeological illustration
 Association of Medical Illustrators
 Biological illustration
 Illustrator
 Information graphics
 Information visualisation
 medical illustration
 Technical communications
 Technical drawing

References

External links

 Technical Illustration – A Historical Perspective by Kevin Hulsey
 Technical Illustration in the 21st Century: A Primer for Today’s Professionals by Parametric Technology Corporation (PTC) 2007. (requires login)
 Stuttgart Database of Scientific Illustrators 1450–1950 (DSI) (with more than 6000 entries and 20 search fields)

Illustration
 
Illustration
Object visualization